Leontios Machairas or Makhairas (Greek: Λεόντιος Μαχαιράς, French: Léonce Machéras; about 1380 - after 1432) was a historian in medieval Cyprus.

The main source of information on him is his chronicle, written in the medieval Cypriot dialect. The chronicle documents events from the visit of Saint Helena to Cyprus until the times of the Kingdom of Cyprus. Machairas was Orthodox Christian but wrote with respect for the pope and the Catholic ruling class of Cyprus for whom he was working. He is the only source on the "Re Alexis" rebellion of Cypriot serfs, which he condemned. Following the usual Byzantine practice, he only used the word "basileus" (Greek for sovereign) for the Byzantine emperor at Constantinople, and referred to the king of Cyprus as "regas" (from Latin rex king). Machairas was also present at the Battle of Choirokoitia. The text as we have it became abbreviated after 1432, and historians believe the remainder of the text is a subsequent accretion.

There are manuscripts of the Chronicle at the Bodleian Library in Oxford, the Biblioteca Marciana in Venice, and Ravenna. The Oxford manuscript was copied in Paphos in June 1555, according to an additional paragraph after the end of the chronicle. The chronicle was published by Konstantinos Sathas as part of his Medieval Library in Venice in 1873. The chronicles of Cyprus by Francesco Amadi and Diomede Strambaldi published by Rene de Mas Latrie in Paris in 1891 were translations of Machairas's chronicle into Italian.

The chronicle was published again by Richard M. Dawkins with an English translation as "Recital Concerning the Sweet Land of Cyprus Entitled 'Chronicle' - The chronicle of Makhairas" in Oxford in 1932. The Ravenna manuscript has not yet been incorporated into a critical edition.

Publication history 

 Σάθας, K. Μεσαιωνική Βιβλιοθήκη Τόμος Β΄. Χρονογράφοι Βασιλείου Κύπρου. Εν Βενετία: Τύποις του Χρόνου (1873).
 Miller. E & Sathas. K. Λεοντίου Μαχαιρά Χρονικόν Κύπρου. Paris (1882).

See also 

 Neophytos the Recluse
 Georgios Voustronios
 Florio Bustron
Chronicle of ‘Amadi’
 Kingdom of Cyprus

References

External links 

 Text (Nick Nicholas)
 Text (Univ. of Athens)

15th-century Greek people
15th-century writers
Year of death missing
Cypriot non-fiction writers
Cypriot historians
Eastern Orthodox Christians from Cyprus
People of the Kingdom of Cyprus
Bodleian Library collection
Year of birth uncertain